is an interchange commuter railway station located in  Kōhoku-ku, Yokohama, Kanagawa Prefecture, Japan. It is operated jointly by the private railway company Tokyu Corporation and by the East Japan Railway Company (JR East).

Lines

Station layout
The JR East portion of Kikuna Station has a single island platform serving two elevated tracks, connected to the station building and the Tōkyū Tōyoko Line by an underpass. The station has a Midori no Madoguchi staffed ticket office. Tōkyū Tōyoko Kikuna Station has two island platforms serving four tracks.

JR East platforms

Tokyu platforms

History 
Kikuna Station was opened on February 14, 1926 as a  station on the privately held Tokyo-Yokohama Railway Company (the predecessor to the Tōkyū Tōyoko Line). The Japanese Government Railways (the predecessor to the JNR) began operations to Kikuna on September 1 of the same year. All freight operations were suspended from 1970. In 1972, Tōkyū Tōyoko Line portion of the station was rebuilt, with new elevated tracks and a new station building; however, the tracks remained unused until the Tokyo Metro Hibiya Line connected to the station in 1988 (which was then discontinued on 15 March 2013 when the Daikan-yama to Shibuya section of Tōkyū Tōyoko Line was moved to underground and with through running to Tokyo Metro Fukutoshin Line began). With the privatization of the JNR on April 1, 1987, the JNR portion of the station came under the operational control of JR East. The Tōkyū Tōyoko Line platforms were lengthened in 1991 to accommodate seven-car trains; with through running with Fukutoshin Line, the platforms were lengthened again to accommodate ten-car trains.

Station numbering was introduced to the Yokohama Line platforms 20 August 2016 with Kikuna being assigned station number JH15.

Passenger statistics
In fiscal 2019, the JR portion of the station was used by an average of 53,819 passengers daily (boarding passengers only). During the same period, the Tokyo portion of the station was used by an average of 136,992 passengers daily (total passengers). 

The daily average passenger figures (boarding only) for previous years are as shown below.

Surrounding area
 Eiri Girls'High School (formerly Takagi Girls' High School) /
Yokohama Municipal Kikuna Elementary School
Yokohama Municipal Kohoku Library 
Rensho-ji Temple
Kikuna Shrine

References

External links

 JR Kikuna Station (JR East)
Tokyu Station 

Railway stations in Kanagawa Prefecture
Railway stations in Japan opened in 1926
Yokohama Line
Tokyu Toyoko Line
Stations of Tokyu Corporation